Sophie De Wit (born 28 August 1973 in Deurne) is a Belgian politician and is affiliated to the N-VA. She was elected as a member of the Flemish Parliament in 2009.  On 6 July 2010 her membership came to an end as she became that day a member of the Belgian Chamber of Representatives after being elected in June 2010.

She has also been mayor of Aartselaar since 2013.

Notes

1973 births
Living people
Members of the Chamber of Representatives (Belgium)
Members of the Flemish Parliament
New Flemish Alliance politicians
Paris 2 Panthéon-Assas University alumni
People from Aartselaar
People from Deurne, Belgium
Women mayors of places in Belgium
21st-century Belgian politicians
21st-century Belgian women politicians